Brookhaven may refer to:

Places

Canada
 Amesbury, Toronto, also known as Brookhaven-Amesbury, a Toronto neighbourhood

United States
 Brookhaven, Georgia, a city just northeast of Atlanta
 Brookhaven/Oglethorpe (MARTA station), a passenger rail station in Brookhaven, Georgia
 Brookhaven, Mississippi
 Brookhaven, New York, a town in Suffolk County
 Brookhaven (CDP), New York, a hamlet within the town
 Brookhaven, Pennsylvania
 Brookhaven, Fresno, California, neighborhood

Other uses 
 Brookhaven College, a college in Dallas, Texas
 Brookhaven High School (Columbus, Ohio), a high school in Columbus, Ohio
 Brookhaven National Laboratory, a research facility in Upton, New York
 Brookhaven RP, a game on the Roblox platform